Christina Schollin (born Christina Alma Elisabet Schollin; 26 December 1937) is a Swedish actress. She is best known to international audiences mainly through her appearances in motion pictures, such as Dear John, Song of Norway and Ingmar Bergman's Fanny and Alexander.

The "angel" theme has become an integral part of Schollin's image, and until 2011 she ran her own gift shop with that motif and product, plus an adjacent lounge for performing arts, in the Old Town Gamla stan of Stockholm.

She is known in Sweden for her roles as Margaretha Öhman in the series Varuhuset, and Birgitta Wästberg in the series Tre Kronor. Lately she is also known for participating in her daughter Pernilla Wahlgren's TV series Wahlgrens värld which is broadcast on Kanal 5.

Family
Since 1962, she is married to actor Hans Wahlgren; the couple have four children: Peter, Niclas, Pernilla  and Linus Wahlgren. 

She won the award for Best Actress at the 3rd Guldbagge Awards for her role in Ormen.

References

External links 

1937 births
Living people
Swedish film actresses
Best Actress Guldbagge Award winners
Actresses from Stockholm